Joculator simulans is a species of minute sea snail, a marine gastropod mollusc in the family Cerithiopsidae.

The species was described by Cecalupo and Perugia in 2012.

Distribution
This marine species occurs off the Philippines.

References

  Cecalupo A. & Perugia I. (2012) Family Cerithiopsidae H. Adams & A. Adams, 1853 in the central Philippines (Caenogastropoda: Triphoroidea). Quaderni della Civica Stazione Idrobiologica di Milano 30: 1–262. 
 Cecalupo A. & Perugia I. (2017). Cerithiopsidae and Newtoniellidae (Gastropoda: Triphoroidea) from New Caledonia, western Pacific. Visaya. suppl. 7: 1–175

Gastropods described in 2012
simulans